Subedar and Honorary Captain Karam Singh PVC, MM (15 September 1915 – 20 January 1993), an Indian soldier, was a recipient of the Param Vir Chakra (PVC), India's highest award for gallantry. Singh joined the army in 1941, and took part in the Burma Campaign of World War II, receiving the Military Medal for his actions during the Battle of the Admin Box in 1944. He also fought in the Indo-Pakistani War of 1947, and was awarded the PVC for his role in saving a forward post at Richhmar Gali, south of Tithwal. He was also one of the five soldiers chosen to raise the Indian flag for the first time after independence in 1947. Singh later rose to the rank of subedar, and was conferred the rank of honorary captain before his retirement in September 1969.

Early life
Karam Singh was born on 15 September 1915 in the village of Sehna, Barnala district, in Punjab, British India. His father, Uttam Singh, was a farmer. Singh also intended to become a farmer, but he decided to join the army after being inspired by the stories of World War I veterans from his village. After completing his primary schooling in his village, in 1941, he joined the Army.

Military career 
On 15 September 1941, he enrolled in the 1st battalion of the Sikh Regiment. For his conduct and courage in the Battle of the Admin Box during the Burma Campaign of World War II, he was awarded the Military Medal. As a young, war-decorated sepoy, he earned respect from fellow soldiers in his battalion. He was one of the five soldiers selected by then Prime Minister Jawaharlal Nehru to raise the Indian flag for the first time after independence in 1947.

War of 1947
In the aftermath of the independence of India in 1947, India and Pakistan fought over the princely state of Kashmir for a brief period. During the initial stages of the conflict, Pakistan's Pashtun tribal militias crossed the border of the state, occupying several villages, including  Tithwal. That village, being on the Line of Control in the Kupwara Sector, was a strategically important point for India.

On 23 May 1948, the Indian Army captured Tithwal from Pakistan troops, but the Pakistans quickly launched a counter-attack to recapture the area. The Indian troops, unable to withstand the attack, withdrew from their positions to the Tithwal ridge, preparing to regain their positions at the right moment.

As the battle at Tithwal continued for months, the Pakistanis grew desperate and launched a massive attack on 13 October, hoping to drive the Indians from their positions. Their primary objective was to capture the Richhmar Gali, located south of Tithwal, and the Nastachur Pass, east of Tithwal. During the fierce battle on the night of 13 October at Richhmar Gali, Lance Naik Singh was commanding a 1SIKH forward post.

Although outnumbered ten-to-one by the Pakistani troops, the Sikhs repelled their attacks multiple times. With their ammunition running out, Singh ordered his men to join the main company, knowing that reinforcement was impossible under Pakistani shelling. With the help of another soldier, he brought two injured men along, though he himself was wounded. Under the heavy Pakistani fire, Singh moved from position to position, boosting the morale of his men and intermittently throwing grenades. Despite being wounded twice on both the hands, he refused evacuation and continued to hold the first line of trenches.

During the fifth wave of attacks, two Pakistani soldiers closed on Singh's position; Singh jumped out of his trench and killed them with his bayonet, greatly demoralizing the Pakistanis. Singh and his men then successfully repelled three more enemy attacks before the Pakistani troops finally retreated, unable to capture their position.

Param Vir Chakra

On 21 June 1950, Singh's award of the Param Vir Chakra was gazetted. The citation read:

On 10 January 1957, now a havildar (sergeant), Singh was promoted to the junior commissioned officer (JCO) rank of jemadar (later redesignated naib subedar) with the service number of JC-6415.  He was promoted to subedar on 1 March 1964, and was later promoted to subedar-major. On 26 January 1969, he received an honorary commission in the rank of captain. Singh retired in September 1969. He was one of the five soldiers to have a chance to raise the Indian flag for the first time on the independance day which is known to india biggest respect day .on this day people give respect to indian flag  with the national song

Later life
Singh died on 20 January 1993 in his village, and was survived by his wife, Gurdial Kaur, and children.

Other honours 
In the 1980s, the Shipping Corporation of India (SCI), a Government of India enterprise under the aegis of the Ministry of Shipping, named fifteen of its crude oil tankers in honour of the PVC recipients. The tanker MT Lance Naik Karam Singh, PVC was delivered to SCI on 30 July 1984, and served for 25 years before being phased out. The government also built a memorial in his honour at the District Administrative Complex in Sangrur.

Notes
Footnotes

Citations

References

Indian Army personnel
People from Barnala
Military personnel from Punjab, India
Recipients of the Military Medal
Recipients of the Param Vir Chakra
1915 births
1993 deaths